The 1878 Mid Somerset by-election was fought on 19 March 1878.  The byelection was fought due to the resignation of the incumbent Conservative MP, Ralph Neville-Grenville.  It was won by the unopposed Conservative candidate William Gore-Langton.

References

1878 in England
1878 elections in the United Kingdom
By-elections to the Parliament of the United Kingdom in Somerset constituencies
19th century in Somerset
Unopposed by-elections to the Parliament of the United Kingdom in English constituencies